Hajar Chenarani is an Iranian sociologist, academic, and politician. She was elected to the Islamic Consultative Assembly in 2016.

She is a member of the National Security and Foreign Policy Commission. She has called on international organizations to intervene in the ongoing Rohingya genocide in Myanmar.

References

Iranian women academics
Members of the Women's fraction of Islamic Consultative Assembly
Politicians from Nishapur
Iranian sociologists
Living people
Year of birth missing (living people)